Kyle McCord (born August 3, 1992) is an American former soccer player.

Career

Early career
McCord was a member of the New York Red Bulls Academy since 2009. He also spent four years playing
college soccer at the University of Virginia between 2011 and 2014 appearing in 37 matches and scoring 3 goals.  He was a member of the team that captured the  2014 NCAA College Cup.

While at college, McCord appeared for USL PDL club Baltimore Bohemians during the 2012 season. On June 21, 2012 he scored his loan goal for the club in a 1-0 victory over Reading United A.C.

Professional
McCord signed with United Soccer League club Harrisburg City Islanders on August 8, 2015. In his one season with the Islanders McCord appeared in five league matches.

In early March 2016 it was announced that McCord would be on trial with New York Red Bulls II.

References

External links

 Virginia bio
 City Islanders profile

1992 births
Living people
American soccer players
Association football midfielders
Baltimore Bohemians players
Penn FC players
Soccer players from Pennsylvania
Sportspeople from Chester County, Pennsylvania
USL Championship players
USL League Two players
Virginia Cavaliers men's soccer players